Urodeta trilobata is a moth of the family Elachistidae first described by Jurate De Prins and Virginijus Sruoga in 2012. It is found in South Africa, where it has been recorded from the Tswaing Crater Reserve in Gauteng.

The wingspan is 5.9–6 mm for males and about 5.8 mm for females. The forewings are mottled with scales, basally whitish and distally ranging from pale brown to blackish brown. Blackish-brown scales form a spot on the fold before the middle of the wing, and other small spot at two-thirds from the base of the wing. The hindwings are brownish grey. Adults have been recorded on wing in November.

Etymology
The specific name refers to the shape of the valva and is derived from Latin tri- (meaning short three) and lobate (meaning having lobes).

References

Elachistidae
Moths described in 2012
Moths of Africa